Richard Langford may refer to:
Richard Langford (MP for Wells), MP for Wells, Somerset
Richard Langford (MP for Ludlow) (died 1580), MP for Ludlow, Shropshire
Richard Langford (priest), Welsh Anglican priest
Richard Langford, character in Two and a Half Deaths

See also
Rick Langford, American baseball pitcher